Defiance is an unincorporated community located in Perry County, Kentucky, United States.

References

Unincorporated communities in Perry County, Kentucky
Unincorporated communities in Kentucky